The Niugini Guardian is a patrol vessel operated by Papua New Guinea and previously operated as the ACV Ashmore Guardian by the Customs Marine Unit of the Australian Customs and Border Protection Service. The former fishing supply vessel Roper K was converted in 2007-08 by Jurong SML in Singapore. It was leased to Customs, primarily to patrol the Ashmore and Cartier Islands for up to 330 days per year.

References

Ships built in Western Australia
Patrol vessels of the Marine Unit (Australian Border Force)
1983 ships
Patrol vessels of the Papua New Guinea Defence Force